The cabinet of Nils Edén was the cabinet of Sweden between 19 October 1917 and 10 March 1920. The cabinet was a coalition government consisting of ministers from the Liberal Coalition Party and the Social Democratic Party, with the Liberal Coalition Party's Nils Edén as Prime Minister. The cabinet succeeded the conservative Swartz cabinet and was succeeded by the social democratic Branting I cabinet.

Ministers 

The cabinet consisted of eleven ministers in eight departments. Of the ministers were nine chiefs of departments and two consultative ministers. Six of the ministers belonged to the Liberal Coalition Party, four to the Social Democratic Party and one was independent.

|}

Notes

References

Sources 

1917 establishments in Sweden
Cabinets of Sweden
Politics of Sweden
1920 disestablishments in Sweden
Cabinets established in 1917
Cabinets disestablished in 1920